Behala High School is a school located at Behala, Kolkata, India. This is a boys' school and is affiliated to the West Bengal Board of Secondary Education for Madhyamik Pariksha (10th Board exams), and to the West Bengal Council of Higher Secondary Education for Higher Secondary Examination (12th Board exams). The school was established in 1886.

Departments of Higher Secondary
Science
Arts
Commerce

References 

Boys' schools in India
High schools and secondary schools in Kolkata
Educational institutions established in 1886
1886 establishments in India